Tapan Halder (born 10 January 2004) is an Indian professional footballer who plays as a forward for I-League club Indian Arrows.

Club career
Born in West Bengal, Halder began his career in the youth system of Mohun Bagan at their SAIL academy.

Indian Arrows
Prior to the 2020–21 season, Halder was announced as part of I-League side Indian Arrows, the development team for the All India Football Federation. He made his debut for the side on 6 December 2020 in their IFA Shield match against Southern Samity. Halder then made his professional debut with the club on 24 February 2021 in an I-League match against TRAU. He came on as an 85th minute substitute as Indian Arrows were defeated 5–1.

Career statistics

References

External links
 Profile at the All India Football Federation

2004 births
Living people
Indian footballers
Association football forwards
Mohun Bagan AC players
Indian Arrows players
I-League players
Footballers from West Bengal